Ana Maiques (born in Valencia, Spain, in 1972) is a Spanish entrepreneur and business executive. She is CEO of neuroscience-based medical device company Neuroelectrics, based in Barcelona, which produces devices designed to stimulate and treat the brain.

Ana Maiques was named as one of the Most Inspiring Fifty Women in Europe.

Education 
Maiques studied economics at the University of Barcelona and has an MBA from London Metropolitan University. She has also completed IESE Business School's advanced management program.

Business 
Maiques began working in Barcelona for Belgian-owned company Starlab in 1999, where she worked with her husband Giulio Ruffini (they had met in Barcelona a couple of years before). In 2001, when Starlab declared bankruptcy, they took over the company's Barcelona-based research division with Manel Adell. Starlab went on to develop revolutionary technologies in the fields of space and neuroscience.

In 2014, Maiques won third prize in the European Woman Innovator of the Year awards, for her entrepreneurial vision in promoting Starlab as an innovative company of scientific excellence.

Maiques founded Starlab spin-off Neuroelectrics in Barcelona, Spain, in 2011, and established officers in Boston, United States in 2014. Focused on developing medical devices for the brain, Maiques describes Neuroelectrics as a "digital brain health company" that aims to treat brain disease in a non-invasive, personalized way through the use of technology.

The devices Neuroelectrics develops record brain activity and stimulate the brain by administering small currents, while brain models and algorithms enable treatments to be customized to the needs of individual patients. Its brain reading and electro-stimulation headgear has been used to measure brain fatigue in NASA pilots and may have applications in the treatment of epilepsy. Other areas of research include applications in neurodegenerative diseases such as Parkinson's and Alzheimer's, and in anxiety and depression.

Personal life 
Ana Maiques is married to physicist Giulio Ruffini. She has four children, and spends her time between Barcelona and Boston.

Awards and recognition 
 2010: Nominated as one of the most influential entrepreneurs in Spain under 40 by the University of Navarre's IESE Business School
 2014: EU Prize for Women Innovators
 2014: International Women's Entrepreneurial Challenge (IWEC)
 2015: Best Start-Up Health Award (for Neuroelectrics), Wired Health (UK)
 2015: One of Inspiring Fifty's most inspiring European female leaders in the technology sector
 2016: One of the Best Entrepreneurial Companies in America (for Neuroelectrics) in Entrepreneur Magazine's "Entrepreneur 360" list

References

Living people
21st-century Spanish businesswomen
21st-century Spanish businesspeople
Spanish chief executives
People from Valencia
1972 births